Greyday Productions, sometimes called simply Greyday Records, is an independent record label based in Portland, Oregon, United States.  Formed to release a new record from Still Life, Greyday is operated mainly by Todd Berry (who moved to Portland from Los Angeles in 2001). Greyday Records is distributed by Burnside Distribution Corporation.

Artists

Books on Tape
Bronwyn
Consafos
DeLorax
The Empty
Gone Done Wrong
Grey Anne
Head of Femur
The Heligoats
Sean Madigan Hoen
I Was Totally Destroying It
John Larsen
Leaving Rouge
LKN
Mayday
Minmae
The Old Ground
Piney Gir
Piney Gir Country Roadshow
Polly Panic
Patrick Porter
Sam Humans
Shipbuilding Co.
Southerly
Still Life
Today the Moon, Tomorrow the Sun
The Trophy Fire

Greydawn Records
Greydawn is operated by Greyday Records in Portland, Oregon. It is a collective of independent and self-releasing artists.

Bands:
Jon Crocker
Curious Hands
The Minor Thirds
The Mouse That Roared
The Vulturines

See also
 List of companies based in Oregon
List of record labels

References

External links
Greyday Records

Companies based in Portland, Oregon
American independent record labels
Oregon record labels
Privately held companies based in Oregon